Perigracilia delicata is a species of beetle in the family Cerambycidae. It was described by Knull in 1942.

References

Graciliini
Beetles described in 1942